Men of the Mormon Tabernacle Choir is a religious compilation album released by the Mormon Tabernacle Choir.

The album first topped the Billboard Classical albums chart the week of January 29, 2011, and spent a total of seven weeks at the top of that chart in 2011.

Track listing

Charts

References

2010 albums
Tabernacle Choir compilation albums